Lieutenant General Anatoly Nikolayevich Khrulyov (Naro-Fominsk, 3 June 1955) is a Russian general who was the commander of the Russian 58th Army from 2006 until his retirement in 2010. He saw service in South Ossetia during the 2008 Russo-Georgian War, in the course of which he was wounded when his military column moving into Tskhinvali was attacked by Georgian forces on 9 August 2008. On 18 May 2015, he was appointed Chief of the General Staff of the armed forces of Georgia's breakaway Republic of Abkhazia, in which position he was succeeded, 3 August 2018, by Major General Vasily Lunyov, also a career Russian officer.

References 

1955 births
Living people
People from Naro-Fominsky District
Russian colonel generals
Soviet Army officers
People of the Russo-Georgian War
Military Academy of the General Staff of the Armed Forces of Russia alumni